Albert Lee "Sonny" Davis (born January 16, 1948) is a former American football running back who played in the National Football League. He played college football at Tennessee State.

Early life and high school
Davis was born and grew up in Alcoa, Tennessee and attended Alcoa High School. 
Davis was the first athlete to compete in integrated sports in Blount County, Tennessee and was named All-County, All-State and All-American as a junior and senior.

College career
Davis was one of the first African American players to be recruited by the University of Tennessee along with Lester McClain, but ultimately enrolled at Tennessee State after Tennessee questioned his test scores. Davis played four seasons for the Tigers and led the team with six touchdowns scored as a sophomore.

Professional career
Davis was selected in the 11th round of the 1971 NFL Draft by the Philadelphia Eagles. As a rookie, he rushed for 163 yards and one touchdown on 47 carries and caught 11 passes for 46 yards.

Davis played for The Hawaiians of the World Football League 
from 1974 to 1975.

Post-football
After retiring from football, Davis became a teacher in the Camden School District and eventually became a high school principal.

References

1948 births
Living people
Tennessee State Tigers football players
Players of American football from Tennessee
Philadelphia Eagles players
American football running backs
The Hawaiians players
African-American players of American football
20th-century African-American people